is a passenger railway station located in the city of  Yokosuka, Kanagawa Prefecture, Japan, operated by the private railway company Keikyū.

Lines
YRP Nobi Station is served by the Keikyū Kurihama Line and is located 7.2 rail kilometers from the junction at Horinouchi Station, and 59.5 km from the starting point of the Keikyū Main Line at Shinagawa Station in Tokyo.

Station layout
The station consists of two opposed side platforms  with the station building underneath. The station acts as a passing loop on the single track section of the Kurihama Line between Keikyū Kurihama Station and Keikyū Nagasawa Station.

Platforms

History
YRP Nobi Station opened on November 1, 1963 as the southern terminal station for the Kurihama Line, At that time, it was named simply . It became a through station on March 27, 1966 when the Kurihama Line was extended to Tsukuihama Station. With the opening of the nearby Yokosuka Research Park, the station was renamed on April 1, 1998. It is the fourth station in Japan (and the first non-JR station) to have letters of the alphabet in its name.

Keikyū introduced station numbering to its stations on 21 October 2010; YRP Nobi Station was assigned station number KK68.

Passenger statistics
In fiscal 2019, the station was used by an average of 18,536 passengers daily. 

The passenger figures for previous years are as shown below.

Surrounding area
 Yokosuka Research Park
 Nobi Beach
 Nobi Shopping Street

See also
 List of railway stations in Japan

References

External links

 

Railway stations in Kanagawa Prefecture
Railway stations in Japan opened in 1963
Keikyū Kurihama Line
Railway stations in Yokosuka, Kanagawa